Oksana Anatolyevna Zakalyuzhnaya (born 18 December 1977) is a retired Russian basketball center. She was part of the Russian team that won the silver medal at the 2002 World Championships. Between 1994 and 2012 she played for Russian, American, Hungarian and Turkish clubs, winning the Turkish national title with Fenerbahçe in 2001, and reaching the European Cup finals in 2008 and 2010. She also played in the Women's National Basketball Association (WNBA) for the Detroit Shock and Phoenix Mercury.

References

1977 births
Living people
Russian women's basketball players
Olympic basketball players of Russia
Basketball players at the 1996 Summer Olympics
Detroit Shock players
Phoenix Mercury players
Sportspeople from Arkhangelsk
Centers (basketball)